Edgeworth Glacier is a glacier  long, flowing south-southwestwards from the edge of Detroit Plateau below Wolseley Buttress and Paramun Buttress between Trave Peak and Chipev Nunatak into Mundraga Bay west of Sobral Peninsula, on the Nordenskjöld Coast of Graham Land. It was mapped from surveys by the Falkland Islands Dependencies Survey (1960–61), and was named by the UK Antarctic Place-Names Committee for Richard Lovell Edgeworth, the British inventor of the "portable railway," the first track-laying vehicle, in 1770.

References 

 SCAR Composite Antarctic Gazetteer.

Glaciers of Nordenskjöld Coast